Juris Silovs may refer to:
 Juris Silovs (athlete) (1950–2018), Soviet sprinter
 Juris Silovs (cyclist) (born 1973), Latvian cyclist